LIGO is a 2019 American documentary film that tells the inside account of the discovery by the international LIGO Scientific Collaboration of the first observation of gravitational waves in September 2015, a discovery that led two years later to the Nobel Prize in Physics for LIGO physicists Rai Weiss, Kip Thorne and Barry Barish.  In December 2019, National Geographic named the LIGO detections at the top of its list of The 20 Top Scientific Discoveries of the Decade.

Synopsis
LIGO was written, directed and edited by Les Guthman.  It was produced by the Advanced LIGO Documentary Project and XPLR Productions in a collaboration with the LIGO Scientific Collaboration, Caltech and MIT,  and financed by a grant from U.S. National Science Foundation and support from MathWorks, Caltech and MIT.  The documentary is divided into six chapters, WARPED SPACE, WHAT'S OUT THERE, INVENTING LIGO, THE UNIVERSE GETS 50 TIMES BRIGHTER, HEARING THE UNIVERSE and STOCKHOLM.  It begins as Guthman did, arriving innocently at the LIGO Livingston Observatory in September 2015 and then almost immediately being swept up in a great human experience, scientific or otherwise.  The discovery of the first gravitational wave capped a 50-year, $1 billion search for these elusive messengers from warped space, predicted by Albert Einstein a century ago. It was the dramatic and emotional peak in the lives of the 1,000 scientists around the world who had risked their careers on a discovery Einstein himself had thought impossible: Detecting a billion-year-old wave of warped space the size of one atom in the distance between the earth and the sun.  The film chapters chronicle the six phases of the LIGO discoveries:  1) The detection of GW150914;  2) the four-month interlude when LIGO kept the discovery secret as they confirmed the detection beyond all doubt and wrestled with its apparent truth;  3) the discovery announcement in February 2016 at an international media event;  4) followed by a year of emotional letdown and unexpected technical crises at LIGO's two observatories;  5) then their second unexpected and dramatic history-making detection of two colliding neutron stars and its spectacular light show seen by over 70 observatories and space-based cameras around the world;  6) and finally, Nobel Prize week in Stockholm.

Production
Production on the documentary began in August 2015.  Three weeks later, Guthman was on location with his crew at the LIGO Livingston Observatory near Baton Rouge, Louisiana when the historic detection, which was not expected for another year, was made.  Production documented LIGO's secret months-long intensive examination of the detection, before it was announced that the National Press Club in Washington, D.C. in February 2016; and production continued, along with script development, through 2016 and 2017. And then, in August 2017, as the film was about to go into post-production, LIGO made the second major discovery, GW170817, followed by the Nobel Prize announcement in October.  LIGO resumed production, the script was rewritten, and its last shoot was with Weiss, Thorne and Barish in Stockholm, along with more than 50 of their colleagues in December 2017.

Release
The film was completed in May 2019. To date it has been the Official Selection of 22 film festivals.  It has won the Best Documentary award twice, at the 2020 Solaris Film Festival in Vienna, Austria and the 2021 Sigma Xi STEM Film Festival. (Sigma Xi is the Scientific Research Honor Society, STEM is the acronym for Science, Technology, Engineering and Mathematics) A complete list of the festivals, along with the documentary's nine other awards. may be found on the LIGO (Film) official website.

References 

2019 films
2019 documentary films
Documentary films about science
American documentary films
Gravitational-wave astronomy
2010s English-language films
2010s American films